On 13 December 2011, an armed attack occurred in Florence. Two market traders from Senegal, 40-year-old Samb Modou, and 54-year-old Diop Mor, were killed by Gianluca Casseri, who wounded three other Senegalese traders in another market. According to Florentine prosecutor Giuseppe Quattrocchi, the killer shot himself dead as he was approached by police in a car park. The attack was racially motivated according to authorities. The attack occurred during the 2011 Liège attack, which started on the same day, at the same hour.

Timeline

The first shootings were at the Piazza Dalmazia market on Tuesday morning, where two market traders were shot dead and one injured. The killer then fled in a car and wounded two more vendors at the San Lorenzo later that day. He shot himself when confronted by armed police.

Response to shootings
After the shootings some people protested, marching to the Prefects' office, demanding justice and a representative met the prefect. Some Senegalese met in the Duomo square to pray.

CasaPound, an Italian far-right and neo-fascist group, described him as a sympathiser but not a member.

The attacker
The attacker was 50-year-old Gianluca Casseri, an accountant from Pistoia who had a history of involvement in far-right politics. In 2010 he published an historical novel La Chiave del Caos, co-authored with Enrico Rulli. He also published a newsletter for fans of J. R. R. Tolkien.

See also
 List of right-wing terrorist attacks
 Racism in Italy
 CasaPound
Mercato Centrale (Florence)
2011 Liège attack
2018 Florence shooting

References

Anti-black racism in Europe
Deaths by firearm in Italy
December 2011 crimes
December 2011 events in Italy
Murder–suicides in Europe
Racism in Italy
Spree shootings in Italy
21st century in Florence
2011 murders in Italy
Hate crimes in Europe
2011 mass shootings in Europe
Racially motivated violence against black people
Events in Florence